The Salt River Rafters are a baseball team that plays in the East Division of the Arizona Fall League. They play their home games at Salt River Fields at Talking Stick near Scottsdale, Arizona. The ballpark is also the spring training facility of the Arizona Diamondbacks and Colorado Rockies. The team was established in 1992 as the Grand Canyon Rafters, and has changed locations several times while retaining the same nickname. The Rafters have won five league championships, most recently in 2019. They have won the most division titles, 12, of any team within the Arizona Fall League.

Notable alumni
Garret Anderson, former outfielder for the Los Angeles Dodgers
Nolan Arenado, All-Star third baseman, Colorado Rockies
Jake Bird (born 1995), pitcher for the Colorado Rockies 
Jesse Chavez, pitcher for the Toronto Blue Jays
Ike Davis, first baseman for the Oakland Athletics
Terry Francona, manager of the Cleveland Indians, formerly of the Boston Red Sox
Roy Halladay, former pitcher for the Toronto Blue Jays and the Philadelphia Phillies
Jake Lamb, third baseman for the Arizona Diamondbacks
Grady Little, former manager of the Boston Red Sox and the Los Angeles Dodgers
Kevin Pillar, outfielder for the Toronto Blue Jays and San Francisco Giants
Alfonso Soriano, former outfielder for the New York Yankees, member of the 40–40 club
Michael Young, former infielder for the Texas Rangers
Rowdy Tellez, first baseman/designated hitter in the Toronto Blue Jays organization
Josh Zeid, pitcher for the Houston Astros
Adam Eaton, outfielder with the Washington Nationals
Ryan Klesko, Atlanta Braves, San Diego Padres, SF Giants.

Roster

See also
 Arizona Fall League#Results by season

References

Surprise "Rafters Arizona Fall League." About.com. Retrieved on August 31, 2010.
Salt River Rafters Active Roster MLB.com. Retrieved on November 13, 2011.

External links

Arizona Fall League teams
1992 establishments in Arizona
Baseball teams established in 1992
Professional baseball teams in Arizona
Baseball in Scottsdale, Arizona